Netherplace is a hamlet in East Renfrewshire. It is to the west of Newton Mearns, and adjacent to the M77 motorway. The settlement is almost entirely along the Netherplace Road. It contains a farm, as well as some houses, and a reservoir. It also used to be home to the Netherplace Dye Works, which was demolished in 2016, after a fly infestation across the towns of Newton Mearns and Clarkston.

References 

Villages in East Renfrewshire